The Central District of Kangavar County is a district (bakhsh) in Kangavar County, Kermanshah Province, Iran. At the 2006 census, its population was 80,215, in 19,825 families.  The District has two cities: Kangavar & Gowdin. The District has five rural districts (dehestan): Fash Rural District, Gowdin Rural District, Kermajan Rural District, Khezel-e Gharbi Rural District, and Qazvineh Rural District.

References 

Kangavar County
Districts of Kermanshah Province